Coast to Coast is the third extended play (EP) by the American pop punk band Hit the Lights. The EP was released on June 23, 2009 and features two new songs, two cover songs, and two acoustic versions of existing Hit the Lights songs.

In 2009, Hit the Lights sold the EP as a CD during the Warped Tour and at subsequent shows.

Track listing

Charts

References

External links

Coast to Coast at YouTube (streamed copy where licensed)

Hit the Lights albums
2009 EPs
Triple Crown Records EPs